Antonio Banderas is a Spanish actor and filmmaker who has appeared in various film, television, and theatre productions.

Film

As actor

As director

Television

Theatre

References

External links
 

Male actor filmographies
Director filmographies
Spanish filmographies